Ampatuan, officially the Municipality of Ampatuan (Maguindanaon: Inged nu Ampatuan; Iranun: Inged a Ampatuan), is a 4th class municipality in the province of Maguindanao del Sur, Philippines. According to the 2020 census, it has a population of 28,941 people.

History
Ampatuan was created out of 23 barrios of Datu Piang on 21 June 1959 by Republic Act No. 2509. On 22 November 1973, the municipality of Esperanza was carved out of its territory and was made part of the province of Sultan Kudarat, while Ampatuan itself was made part of Maguindanao, when the old Cotabato province was divided into three provinces on the same date. It further lost territory, when its electorate ratified on 3 January 2004, the separation of ten of its barangays to form the municipality of Datu Abdullah Sangki.

The town was the site of the Maguindanao Massacre on 23 November 2009. The victims were about to file a certificate of candidacy for Esmael Mangudadatu, vice mayor of Buluan town for the province's gubernatorial election. Mangudadatu was challenging Andal Ampatuan Jr. (son of the incumbent Maguindanao governor Datu Andal Ampatuan Sr., the mayor of Datu Unsay, and accused of leading the massacre) in the election. Currently, the elected Municipal Officials are headed by Datu Rasul M. Sangki-Mayor and Datu Samnon M. Sangki-Vice Mayor.

Geography

Barangays
Ampatuan is politically subdivided into 11 barangays.
 Dicalongan (Poblacion)
 Kakal
 Kamasi
 Kapinpilan
 Kauran
 Malatimon
 Matagabong
 Saniag
 Tomicor
 Tubak
 Salman

Climate

Demographics

Economy

References

External links
 Ampatuan Profile at the DTI Cities and Municipalities Competitive Index
 [ Philippine Standard Geographic Code]
 Philippine Census Information
 Local Governance Performance Management System

Municipalities of Maguindanao del Sur